The Prisoner of Zenda, Inc is a 1996 television film starring Jonathan Jackson and William Shatner. It was produced for Showtime Networks under their family division, and first aired in September 1996. The film was written by Rodman Gregg and Richard Clark.

Inspired by the classic 1937 MGM version of Anthony Hope's 1894 novel The Prisoner of Zenda and starring Ronald Colman, The Prisoner of Zenda, Inc. was a contemporary version loosely based on the original. Zenda was the castle in the mythical kingdom of Ruritania in previous versions, whereas Zenda Inc. is a computer business empire in this version.

The film continued the theme of mistaken identities which was central to the plot. Jackson plays Oliver and his lookalike Rudy (who is named after Prince Rudolf from the original, and in this case is a Star Trek fan—a nod to co-star Shatner). The film also starred American character actor Don S. Davis from the popular television series Stargate SG-1.

It was released on VHS under the renamed title Double Play, but reverted to the original title for the DVD release.

References

External links

1996 films
1996 television films
1990s adventure drama films
Films based on The Prisoner of Zenda
Films shot in British Columbia
Showtime (TV network) films
1996 drama films
American drama television films
1990s English-language films
1990s American films